Thrikkariyoor Sree Kottekavu Bhagavathi Temple is situated 4 km from Kothamangalam. The presiding deity of the temple is Devi Adi Parashakti, located in main Sanctum Sanctorum, facing north.  This temple deserves a special mention, as it is believed to have the spirits of Lord Krishna and Lord Shiva. The rites and rituals are based on those of the Arya Dravida traditions. Thrikkariyoor is also believed to be the capital of Chera Dynasty.

Hindu temples in Ernakulam district
Bhagavathi temples in Kerala